The 1929 Segunda División Grupo B season saw 10 teams participate in the third level Spanish league. Cultural Leonesa and Real Murcia were promoted to the 1929–30 Segunda División. There were no teams relegated to another division. The following season this division renamed the Tercera División.

Stadia and locations

League table

Promotion playoff

External links
 The Rec.Sport.Soccer Statistics Foundation

Tercera División seasons
3
Spain